The 2021 Campeonato Internacional de Tênis de Campinas was a professional tennis tournament played on clay courts. It was the tenth edition of the tournament which was part of the 2021 ATP Challenger Tour. It took place in Campinas, Brazil between 15 and 21 November 2021.

Singles main-draw entrants

Seeds

 1 Rankings as of 8 November 2021.

Other entrants
The following players received wildcards into the singles main draw:
  Matheus Bueres
  Gustavo Heide
  Gilbert Klier Júnior

The following players received entry into the singles main draw as alternates:
  Orlando Luz
  Matheus Pucinelli de Almeida

The following players received entry from the qualifying draw:
  Nicolás Álvarez
  Nicolás Álvarez Varona
  Johan Nikles
  Santiago Rodríguez Taverna

Champions

Singles

  Sebastián Báez def.  Thiago Monteiro 6–1, 6–4.

Doubles

  Rafael Matos /  Felipe Meligeni Alves def.  Gilbert Klier Júnior /  Matheus Pucinelli de Almeida 6–3, 6–1.

References

Campeonato Internacional de Tênis de Campinas
2021
November 2021 sports events in Brazil
2021 in Brazilian sport